Miyahara is a Japanese surname. Notable people with the surname include:

, Japanese sport wrestler
Jeff Miyahara (born 1977), American record producer
, Japanese professional wrestler
, Japanese fencer
, Japanese long-distance runner
, Japanese singer and voice actress
, Japanese figure skater
, Nepalese businessman and politician
, Japanese sport wrestler
, Japanese water polo player
, Japanese sport wrestler
, Japanese footballer

Japanese-language surnames